SBS 3 was a geostationary communications satellite designed and manufactured by Hughes (now Boeing) on the HS-376 platform. It was ordered by Satellite Business Systems, which later sold it to Hughes Communications. It had a Ku band payload and operated on the 94°W longitude.

Satellite description 
The spacecraft was designed and manufactured by Hughes on the HS-376 satellite bus.

History 

On November 11, 1982, SBS 3 was finally launched by a Space Shuttle Columbia in the mission STS-5 from Kennedy Space Center at 12:19 UTC. The satellite was launched along with the Canadian communications satellite Anik C3.

On 2 June 1995, SBS 3 was finally decommissioned and put on a graveyard orbit.

See also 

 1982 in spaceflight

References 

Communications satellites
1982 in spaceflight
Satellites using the HS-376 bus